Janice Waddy (born 1958) is a former netball player from New Zealand, who represented the national team on six occasions and won a gold medal at the 1979 Netball World Championships.

Netball career
Janice Waddy (née Henderson) was born on 31 March 1958. She went to school at St Margaret's College in Christchurch, in the Canterbury region of the South Island of New Zealand. Between 1976 and 1978 she obtained a diploma in education, specialising in physical education, from the Christchurch Teachers College, which was subsequently merged into the University of Canterbury. Waddy played netball for Canterbury and in 1979 was chosen to be part of the New Zealand national netball team, known as the Silver Ferns. Playing as Janice Henderson, she took part in the 1979 World Championships, held in Port of Spain, Trinidad and Tobago, which resulted in a three-way tie for first place between, New Zealand, Australia and the hosts. She was selected again in 1981 for series against England and Australia. She was an adaptable player who played in several positions.

Australia
Waddy later moved to Australia. From 2001 to 2008 she worked for the Australian Sports Commission in Canberra, before joining the commission's parent organization, the Department of Health, working on the department's involvement with major sporting events. She later moved to the Department of Infrastructure and Regional Development, to work on a capacity-building project for Papua New Guinea.

References

1958 births
Living people
New Zealand international netball players
University of Canterbury alumni